Sumner County (standard abbreviation: SU) is a county located in the U.S. state of Kansas. As of the 2020 census, the population was 22,382. Its county seat is Wellington.

History

Early history

For many millennia, the Great Plains of North America was inhabited by nomadic Native Americans. From the 16th century to 18th century, the Kingdom of France claimed ownership of large parts of North America.  In 1762, after the French and Indian War, France secretly ceded New France to Spain, per the Treaty of Fontainebleau. In 1802, Spain returned most of the land to France, but keeping title to about 7,500 square miles.

In 1803, most of the land for modern day Kansas was acquired by the United States from France as part of the 828,000 square mile Louisiana Purchase for 2.83 cents per acre. In 1848, after the Mexican–American War, the Treaty of Guadalupe Hidalgo with Spain brought into the United States all or part of land for ten future states, including southwest Kansas. In 1854, the Kansas Territory was organized, then in 1861 Kansas became the 34th U.S. state.

19th century
On February 26, 1867, Sumner County was created from parts of Marion County and Butler County. It was named in honor of Charles Sumner, a U.S. Senator from Massachusetts (1811–74), who was a strong advocate of Kansas becoming a free state.

In 1887, the Chicago, Kansas and Nebraska Railway built a branch line north–south from Herington to Caldwell.  This branch line connected Herington, Lost Springs, Lincolnville, Antelope, Marion, Aulne, Peabody, Elbing, Whitewater, Furley, Kechi, Wichita, Peck, Corbin, Wellington, Caldwell.  By 1893, this branch line was incrementally built to Fort Worth, Texas.  This line is called the "OKT".  The Chicago, Kansas and Nebraska Railway was foreclosed in 1891 and was taken over by Chicago, Rock Island and Pacific Railway, which shut down in 1980 and reorganized as Oklahoma, Kansas and Texas Railroad, merged in 1988 with Missouri Pacific Railroad, and finally merged in 1997 with Union Pacific Railroad.  Most locals still refer to this railroad as the "Rock Island".

21st century
The casino is located a couple blocks west of the turnpike exit.

Geography

Adjacent counties
 Sedgwick County (north)
 Butler County (northeast)
 Cowley County (east)
 Kay County, Oklahoma (southeast)
 Grant County, Oklahoma (southwest)
 Harper County (west)
 Kingman County (northwest)

Demographics

Sumner County is part of the Wichita, KS Metropolitan Statistical Area.

As of the census of 2000, there were 25,946 people, 9,888 households, and 7,089 families residing in the county.  The population density was 22 people per square mile (8/km2).  There were 10,877 housing units at an average density of 9 per square mile (4/km2).  The racial makeup of the county was 94.62% White, 0.71% Black or African American, 1.05% Native American, 0.22% Asian, 0.05% Pacific Islander, 1.29% from other races, and 2.06% from two or more races.  3.58% of the population were Hispanic or Latino of any race.

There were 9,888 households, out of which 34.50% had children under the age of 18 living with them, 59.90% were married couples living together, 8.00% had a female householder with no husband present, and 28.30% were non-families. 25.60% of all households were made up of individuals, and 12.40% had someone living alone who was 65 years of age or older.  The average household size was 2.58 and the average family size was 3.10.

In the county, the population was spread out, with 28.50% under the age of 18, 7.50% from 18 to 24, 26.20% from 25 to 44, 22.40% from 45 to 64, and 15.50% who were 65 years of age or older.  The median age was 38 years. For every 100 females, there were 96.80 males.  For every 100 females age 18 and over, there were 93.90 males.

The median income for a household in the county was $39,415, and the median income for a family was $46,739. Males had a median income of $36,616 versus $23,020 for females. The per capita income for the county was $18,305.  About 7.20% of families and 9.50% of the population were below the poverty line, including 11.20% of those under age 18 and 6.80% of those age 65 or over.

Government

Presidential elections
Sumner County, like many neighboring counties, often votes for the Republican Party in presidential elections. However, in 1992 independent candidate Ross Perot came within two percent of winning the county against George H. W. Bush. The last time the county voted for a Democratic candidate was Jimmy Carter in 1976.

Laws
Following amendment to the Kansas Constitution in 1986, Sumner County remained a prohibition, or "dry", county until 1992, when voters approved the sale of alcoholic liquor by the individual drink with a 30 percent food sales requirement.

Education

Unified school districts
 Mulvane USD 263
 Wellington USD 353
 Conway Springs USD 356
 Belle Plaine USD 357
 Oxford USD 358
 Argonia USD 359
 Caldwell USD 360
 South Haven USD 509

Communities

Cities

 Argonia
 Belle Plaine
 Caldwell
 Conway Springs
 Geuda Springs (partly in Cowley County)
 Hunnewell
 Mayfield
 Milan
 Mulvane (partly in Sedgwick County)
 Oxford
 South Haven
 Wellington

Unincorporated communities
† means a Census-Designated Place (CDP) by the United States Census Bureau.

 Adamsville
 Anson
 Ashton
 Cicero
 Corbin
 Dalton
 Drury
 Millerton
 Milton†
 Peck†  (partly in Sedgwick County)
 Perth
 Portland
 Riverdale
 Rome
 Suppesville
 Zyba

Ghost towns
 Ewell

Townships
Sumner County is divided into thirty townships.  The cities of Caldwell and Wellington are considered governmentally independent and are excluded from the census figures for the townships.  In the following table, the population center is the largest city (or cities) included in that township's population total, if it is of a significant size.

See also
 National Register of Historic Places listings in Sumner County, Kansas
 Chisholm Trail

References

Notes

Further reading

 Standard Atlas of Sumner County, Kansas; Geo. A. Ogle & Co; 100 pages; 1918.
 Standard Atlas of Sumner County, Kansas; Geo. A. Ogle & Co; 68 pages; 1902.
 Edwards' Historical Atlas of Sumner County, Kansas; John P. Edwards; 59 pages; 1883.

External links

County
 
 Sumner County - Directory of Public Officials
Historical
 Sumner County Historical and Genealogical Society
 Sumner County Historical and Genealogical Research Center
Maps
 Sumner County Maps: Current, Historic, KDOT
 Kansas Highway Maps: Current, Historic, KDOT
 Kansas Railroad Maps: Current, 1996, 1915, KDOT and Kansas Historical Society

 
Kansas counties
1870 establishments in Kansas
Wichita, KS Metropolitan Statistical Area
Populated places established in 1870